Charles Harrison (born 21 March 1974) has been Organist and Master of the Choristers of Chichester Cathedral since September 2014, succeeding Sarah Baldock. He has also held musical posts at Southwell Minster, Carlisle and Lincoln Cathedral.

Early life and education
Harrison was a cathedral chorister at Southwell Minster, where was tutored by Kenneth Beard and Paul Hale, and he took up the organ scholarship at Southwell in 1991 while he studied for A-levels at Southwell Minster School. In the following year, he started as an organ scholar at Jesus College, Cambridge in 1992, where he read for a degree in music. Whilst at Cambridge, he studied the organ with David Sanger and, in his second year, became a prizewinning Fellow of the Royal College of Organists. When he graduated, he was appointed to the position of Assistant Organist at Carlisle Cathedral.

Career

Carlisle
Whilst at Carlisle Cathedral, Harrison developed his career as a solo instrumentalist, appearing in recitals and numerous international competitions. In 1999, he was awarded prizes in the St Albans International Organ Festival, and in the following year at the Odense International Organ Competition. After three years at Carlisle, he moved to Belfast, Northern Ireland.

Belfast
In 2000, Harrison took up a part-time teaching position at Queen's University Belfast, specialising in harmony, counterpoint and keyboard skills. He also became Director of Music at St George's Church, Belfast.

Lincoln
In September 2003, Harrison returned to England, having been appointed Assistant Director of Music and Sub Organist of Lincoln Cathedral after Simon Morley left to become Director of Music at Ripon Cathedral. Harrison held the position for eleven years, accompanying services and directing the choir of boys and men, and latterly the choir of girls and men. Following the resignation of Sarah Baldock in 2014, he took up the position as Organist and Master of the Choristers at Chichester Cathedral.

Chichester
Harrison moved to Chichester in September 2014, as Organist and Master of the Choristers, directing the Choir of Chichester Cathedral. He has recorded the lest we forget CD, and conducted in many Southern Cathedral Festivals performances, including Johann Sebastian Bach’s St. John’s Passion. In 2020, he scheduled the choir for a tour to Germany but it was unfortunately cancelled due to the pandemic.

Discography
 2018 – Lest We Forget, with Timothy Ravalde (organ) and Chichester Cathedral Choir, for Signum Records
 2016 – Long, Long Ago: Christmas Music from Chichester, with Timothy Ravalde (organ) and Chichester Cathedral Choir, for Concentio
 2016 – The Complete Psalms of David: Volume 10, Series 2, with Timothy Ravalde (organ) and Chichester Cathedral Choir, for Priory Records
 2013 – Great Hymns from Lincoln, with Aric Prentice (director) and Lincoln Minster School Chamber Choir, for Priory Records
 2012 – IRELAND, J.: Church Music, with Aric Prentice (director) and Lincoln Cathedral Choir, for Naxos Records
 2011 – Organ Duets by Mozart, Mendelssohn, Langlais, Tomkins, Carleton, Johnstone, Leighton, with David Leigh (organ), for Guild Records
 2008 – O be joyful in the Lord, with Aric Prentice (director) and Lincoln Cathedral Choir, for Guild Records
 2006 – Schmitt: Orchestral Music, with BBC National Orchestra and Chorus of Wales conducted by Thierry Fischer, for Hyperion Records
 2005 – Hail Mary, with Aric Prentice (director) and Lincoln Cathedral Choir, for Guild Records
 1998 – Comfort & Joy: Music for Advent, Christmas, Epiphany and Candlemas, with Jeremy Suter (director) and Carlisle Cathedral Choir

See also
Organs and organists of Chichester Cathedral

References

External links
Official website
LinkedIn profile

1974 births
Living people
People educated at Southwell Minster School
Alumni of Jesus College, Cambridge
English classical organists
British male organists
Cathedral organists
English conductors (music)
British male conductors (music)
Organists & Masters of the Choristers of Chichester Cathedral
21st-century British conductors (music)
21st-century organists
21st-century British male musicians
Male classical organists